Pilu is a 2022 Indian Bengali drama television series that released on 10 January 2022 on Zee Bangla. It is also available on the digital platform ZEE5. The series is produced under the banner of Zee Bangla Productions. It stars Megha Daw and Gourab Roy Chowdhury in lead roles.

Plot 
Pilu is a folk singer and comes from a village. Her singing impresses Aditya, who is actually Pilu's father, whom she has never met, owner of "Suramandal" music institute where classical music is practised. Aditya appoints his favorite student, Aahir, as her music teacher to improve her singing system. Despite their initial differences in music, love blossoms between them. A few days later, they are shocked to learn that Aditya is Pilu's father.

Cast

Main 
 Megha Daw as Piyali Basu Mallick (née Mitra) aka Pilu – a folk singer, Ahir's student turned wife, Sanatan's granddaughter, Aditya and Kalyani's daughter, Rijula's step daughter, Ranjini's paternal half-sister
 Gourab Roy Chowdhury as Aahir Basu Mallick aka Ustaadji – a classical singer, Aditya's student, Pilu's teacher and husband, Sabyasachi and Sohini's son, Mallar's elder cousin brother and rival

Recurring 
 Kaushik Chakraborty as Aditya Narayan Mukhopadhyay – Owner of "Suramandal" music institute; Pandit Gyanendraprasad's student; Kalyani former husband and Rijula's present husband; Pilu and Ranjini's father; Ahir's teacher
 Anjana Basu as Rijula Mukhopadhyay aka Manima – Aditya's second wife; Pandit Gyanendraprasad's eldest daughter; Pilu's stepmother; Ranjini's mother
 Mayna Banerjee as Kalyani Mitra – Pilu's mother; Aditya's first wife; Ranjini's stepmother
 Ashok Mukherjee as Sanatan Mitra - Kalyani's father; Pilu's grandfather
 Idhika Paul as Ranjini Mukhopadhyay aka Ranja – Aditya and Rijula's daughter; Pilu's paternal half-sister; Rangan and Raima's cousin sister; Mallar's wife
 Dhrubajyoti Sarkar as Mallar Basu Mallick aka Ghontu / Mallar Roy Chowdhury (fake) – Sukumar and Rukmini's son; Ahir's cousin brother; Suramandal's rival; Mallika's elder brother; Ranjini's husband
 Biswanath Basu as Uday Narayan Mukhopadhyay – A Tabalia; Pilu and Ranjini's paternal uncle; Aditya's younger brother; Ritoja's husband; Rangan and Raima's father
 Swarnakamal Dutta as Ritoja Mukhopadhyay (née Chattopadhyay) aka Ritu – Gnanendraprasad's youngest daughter; Rijula's younger sister; Uday's wife; Rangan and Raima's mother
 Rudrajit Mukherjee as Rangan Mukhopadhyay – Uday and Ritoja's son; Mallika's husband; Ranjini and Pilu's cousin brother; Raima's elder brother
 Soumi Chakraborty as Raima Mukhopadhyay aka Rai – Uday and Ritoja's daughter; Ranjini and Pilu's cousin sister; Rangan's younger sister
 Aditi Chatterjee as Sohini Basu Mullick – Ahir's mother; Sabyasachi's wife; music teacher at "Suramandal"; Mallar and Mallika's paternal aunt
 Saptarshi Roy as Sabyasachi Basu Mullick – Ahir's father; Sohini's husband; Mallar and Mallika's paternal uncle; Aditya's rival
 Runa Bandyopadhyay as Annapurna Mukhopadhyay aka "Thummum" – Pilu, Ranjini, Raima and Rangan's paternal grandmother; Aditya and Uday's mother
 Promita Chakraborty as Shinjini – Aditya's friend's daughter; Rangan's former love interest
 Samir Biswas as Purnendu Bose aka "Mamadadu" – A lawyer; Rijula and Ritoja's maternal uncle
 Arijit Guha as Digbijay Basu Mallick – Head of Basu Mallick family; Head of "Suroniketan"; Sabyasachi and Sukumar's father; Ahir, Mallar and Mallika's grandfather
 Shyamashish Pahari as Sukumar Basu Mallick – Sabyasachi's younger brother; Ahir's paternal uncle; Rukmini's husband; Mallar and Mallika's father
 Sanjuktaa Roy Chowdhury as Rukmini Basu Mallick – Ahir's paternal aunt; Sukumar's wife; Mallar and Mallika's mother
 Mimi Dutta as Mallika Mukhopadhyay (née Basu Mallick) – Ahir's paternal cousin sister; Rangan's wife; Mallar's younger sister; Sukumar and Rukmini's daughter
 Chaitali Chakroborty as Bijaya Devi (née Basu Mallick) – Digbijay's younger sister; Sabyasachi and Sukumar's paternal aunt; Ahir, Mallar and Mallika's paternal grandaunt
 Biplab Dasgupta as Himangshu Singha Roy aka Gurudev – Basu Mallick family's priest
 Sourav Chatterjee as Gokul – Special Priest for Rath Yatra Puja at "Suromondol"
 Fahim Mirza as Kushal Dutta – Ranja's friend
 Manosi Sengupta as Bindhi - Mallar's fake wife
 Rupam Singha as Mahadev Roy - Bindhi's husband

Guest appearances 
 Saikat Mitra as a judge of Spring special West Bengal Music Research Academy show
 Haimanti Shukla as a judge of Spring special West Bengal Music Research Academy show

Reception

Production

Promo shoot 
The first promo of this series was shot at Saharajore Irrigation Scheme at Purulia.

References 

Zee Bangla original programming
Bengali-language television programming in India
2022 Indian television series debuts
2022 Indian television series endings